Statistics of Kuwaiti Premier League for the 1994–95 season.

Overview
It was contested by 14 teams, and Al Salmiya Club won the championship.

League standings

References
Kuwait - List of final tables (RSSSF)

1994–95
1
1994–95 in Asian association football leagues